State Road 23 is a highway in the north-central part of the U.S. state of Indiana.  In practice it runs from the southwest to the northeast, though it is designated as a north–south route.  It is an undivided surface road.

Route description
From there, it heads north toward Grovertown, where it intersects US 30. SR 23 continues north until Walkerton in the extreme southwestern corner of St. Joseph County, where it meets US 6. After a very brief concurrency with that route, SR 23 departs town to the north, then quickly turns northeast toward South Bend, passing through North Liberty. As it enters the South Bend metropolitan area, SR 23 has an interchange with US 20/US 31 (the St. Joseph Valley Parkway). It then traverses the city of South Bend from southwest to northeast, passing very near the campus of the University of Notre Dame. After crossing under the Indiana East-West Toll Road (I-80/I-90) without providing any access, SR 23 parallels that tollway briefly before reaching an intersection with SR 331, which does provide access to the Toll Road (at its Exit 83). From there SR 23 proceeds northeast into the town of Granger before it curves due north to reach the Michigan state line.

History 
Prior to 1926, the SR 23 designation went from SR 13, north of Pennville, to SR 21, north of Portland. When the Indiana State Highway Commission renumbered most of the state roads in 1926 the SR 23 designation went unused at the time. It wasn’t until late 1930 when the SR 23 designation was used again along its modern routing between US 30, in Grovertown and M-62 at the Michigan state line. This segment of roadway becomes a high type of driving surface between 1939 and 1941. The road was extended south from US 30 to SR 10 in either 1950 or 1951. This section of roadway was paved between 1963 and 1964.

Major intersections

References

External links

023
Transportation in South Bend, Indiana
Transportation in St. Joseph County, Indiana
Transportation in Starke County, Indiana